Charles Owiso (born 19 November 1958) is a Kenyan former professional boxer who won the African lightweight title in 1999 and challenged for the African light welterweight title in 2001. As an amateur, he competed in the men's light welterweight event at the 1984 Summer Olympics.

References

External links
 

1958 births
Living people
Kenyan male boxers
Lightweight boxers
Light-welterweight boxers
African Boxing Union champions
Olympic boxers of Kenya
Boxers at the 1984 Summer Olympics
Boxers at the 1982 Commonwealth Games
Commonwealth Games silver medallists for Kenya
Commonwealth Games medallists in boxing
Place of birth missing (living people)
Medallists at the 1982 Commonwealth Games